The National Aeronautics and Space Administration (NASA) insignia has three main official designs, although the one with stylized red curved text (the "worm") was retired from official use from May 22, 1992, until April 3, 2020, when it was reinstated as a secondary logo. The three logos include the NASA insignia (also known as the "meatball"), the NASA logotype (also known as the "worm"), and the NASA seal.

The NASA seal was approved by President Eisenhower in 1959, and slightly modified by President Kennedy in 1961.

History
The NASA logo dates from 1959, when the National Advisory Committee for Aeronautics (NACA) transformed into an agency that advanced both astronautics and aeronautics—the National Aeronautics and Space Administration.

NASA seal
In the NASA insignia design, the sphere represents a planet, the stars represent space, the red chevron  is a wing representing aeronautics (the latest design in hypersonic wings at the time the logo was developed), and then the orbiting spacecraft going around the wing. It is known officially as the insignia.

NASA "meatball" insignia
After a NASA Lewis Research Center illustrator's design was chosen for the new agency's official seal, the executive secretary of NASA asked James Modarelli, the head of Reports Division at Lewis Research Center, to design a logo that could be used for less formal purposes. Modarelli simplified the seal, leaving only the white stars and orbital path on a round field of blue with a red vector. He then added white N-A-S-A lettering.

NASA "worm" logotype
In 1974, as part of the Federal Graphics Improvement Program of the National Endowment for the Arts, NASA hired Richard Danne and Bruce Blackburn to design a more modern logo. In 1975, the agency switched to the modernist NASA logotype, nicknamed "the worm", a red, stylized rendering of the letters N-A-S-A. The horizontal bars on the "A"s are removed in the worm logo, with the negative space within each of them suggesting the tip of a rocket.

Retirement and return of the "worm"
The NASA logotype was retired from official use on May 22, 1992 by NASA Administrator Daniel Goldin. The design was used only for special occasions and commercial merchandising purposes approved by the Visual Identity Coordinator at NASA Headquarters until 2020, when it was brought out of retirement by administrator Jim Bridenstine, and unveiled on the booster for SpaceX's Crew-Demo 2 Mission.
 
 the "worm" logotype – in a medium blue instead of red – is part of the branding of the NASA Federal Credit Union. For the 2022 Major League Baseball season, the Houston Astros introduced an alternate space-themed uniform as part of the league's City Connect program, with "Space City" rendered in the "worm" logotype in place of the team's name on the jersey front, and numerals and player nameplate in the same font.

Usage

The official NASA seal is reserved for use in connection with the NASA Administrator. It is used in more formal traditional and ceremonial events such as award presentations and press conferences. According to NASA Headquarters, the seal should never be used with the NASA insignia, since the two elements are intended for different purposes and are visually incompatible when seen side by side. 

Since its reintroduction in 2020, the "worm" logotype has been used only for human spaceflight-related activities, featuring prominently on the Crew-1 launch to the ISS and on the SLS rocket.

Like most images produced by the United States Government, the insignia, the "worm" logo and the NASA seal are in the public domain. However, their usage is restricted under Code of Federal Regulations 14 CFR 1221. These NASA emblems should be reproduced only from original reproduction proofs, transparencies, or computer files available from NASA Headquarters.

The colors used in the logo are the following:

Red:
 Pantone 185 
 Process 0C, 100M, 100Y, 0K
 RGB 252R, 61G, 33B
 HEX #FC3D21

Blue:
 Pantone 286
 Process 100C, 060M, 0Y, 0K 
 RGB 11R, 61G, 145B
 HEX #0B3D91

See also
 Space Force Delta
 Seal of the United States Space Force
 Flag of the United States Space Force

References

External links

History Of NASA
Art of the Seal, New York Times 2009-03-08
The history of the meatball vs the worm

Logo
American logos
Insignia